Miguel Ângelo Gomes da Silva (born 20 December 1995) is a Portuguese professional footballer who plays for Leixões as a forward.

Football career
On 28 July 2018, Silva made his professional debut with Oliveirense in a 2018–19 Taça da Liga match against Belenenses.

References

External links

1995 births
Sportspeople from Santa Maria da Feira
Living people
Portuguese footballers
Association football forwards
SC São João de Ver players
C.D. Estarreja players
R.D. Águeda players
U.D. Oliveirense players
Leixões S.C. players
Liga Portugal 2 players
Campeonato de Portugal (league) players